Cyclobutene is a cycloalkene. It is of interest in research but currently has no practical applications.  It is a colorless easily condensed gas. A modern synthesis involves the 2-step dehydration of cyclobutanol.  The compound was first prepared by thermolysis of the ammonium salt [C4H7NMe3]OH.

Cyclobutene thermally isomerizes to 1,3-butadiene. This strongly exothermic reaction reflects the dominance of ring strain.  In contrast, the corresponding equilibrium for hexafluorocyclobutene disfavors hexafluorobutadiene.

See also 
 Cyclobutane
 Cyclobutadiene
 Cyclobutyne
 Squaric acid

References 

Monomers